Clarksville School District 17 is a school district in Johnson County, Arkansas.

References

External links
 

School districts in Arkansas